Wilson Run is a  long tributary to Brandywine Creek in New Castle County, Delaware.  Wilson Run drains the Winterthur area of Delaware.

See also
List of Delaware rivers

References

External links
Winterthur

Rivers of Delaware
Rivers of New Castle County, Delaware
Tributaries of the Christina River